Norman Francis McDermott (13 May 1913 – 4 September 1987) was an Australian rules footballer who played with Essendon in the Victorian Football League (VFL).

McDermott later played with Brunswick in the Victorian Football Association before serving briefly in the Australian Army during World War II.

Notes

External links 

Norm McDermott's playing statistics from The VFA Project

1913 births
1987 deaths
Australian rules footballers from Victoria (Australia)
Essendon Football Club players
Brunswick Football Club players
Australian Army personnel of World War II
Australian Army soldiers
Australian rules footballers from Albury